Joanna Marie Shimkus (born 30 October 1943) is a Canadian film actress. She is the widow of actor Sidney Poitier and mother of actress Sydney Tamiia Poitier.

Early life
Joanna Marie Shimkus was born in Halifax, Nova Scotia, to Joseph Shimkus, a Jewish father of Lithuanian descent and Marie Petrie, a Roman Catholic of Irish descent. Her father worked for the Royal Canadian Navy. She attended a convent school and was brought up in Montreal.

Career
She made her debut in 1964 in Jean Aurel's film De l'amour.  (She was first featured in Jean-Luc Godard's short “Montparnasse-Levallois,” his contribution to the anthology film Six in Paris; it was shot in December 1963, but the film was not released until 1965.)  She was then noticed by film director Robert Enrico, who selected her to appear in three of his films; Les aventuriers (1967), opposite Alain Delon and Lino Ventura, Tante Zita (1968), and Ho! (1968).

She appeared in Joseph Losey's film Boom! (1968), opposite Elizabeth Taylor and Richard Burton, and The Lost Man (1969), opposite Sidney Poitier. Her film career continued until the early 1970s, including roles in L'Invitée (1969), The Virgin and the Gypsy (1970), The Marriage of a Young Stockbroker (1971), and A Time for Loving (1972).

Personal life
Shimkus married Sidney Poitier in 1976, and they have two daughters: Anika and Sydney Tamiia, who is also an actress. Shimkus has three grandchildren; two from Anika and one from Sydney Tamiia. Sidney Poitier died on 6 January 2022, aged 94.

Further reading
 The Illustrated Who's Who of the Cinema, Lloyd Fuller Desser, Portland House, New York, 1987;

References

External links

1943 births
Living people
Actresses from Halifax, Nova Scotia
Canadian expatriate actresses in the United States
Canadian people of Irish descent
Canadian people of Lithuanian-Jewish descent
Canadian film actresses
Canadian television actresses
Canadian people of Jewish descent